Thomas Henry Carter (born 22 November 1953) is a British diplomat who was the British ambassador to Guatemala from 2015 to 2017.

Early life and education 
Carter was born in Norwich to Claude and Anne Carter.  He attended Norwich School and the University of Kent.

Career 
Carter joined the Foreign Office in 1976.  He served as Third Secretary in Paris, 1979–82, after holding positions in other nations he returned to Paris as First Secretary in 1990; and First Secretary in Bonn, 1990–95.  He served as Head of the Political Section, Bangkok, 1999–2003; and Ambassador to Guatemala, 2015–17.

Personal life 
Carter is married to fellow diplomat Carolyn Davidson.  They have 2 sons.

References 

1953 births
Living people
People educated at Norwich School
Alumni of the University of Kent
21st-century British diplomats
Ambassadors of the United Kingdom to Guatemala